Albert Rhodes (9 April 1889 – 10 March 1970) was an English cricketer. Rhodes was a right-handed batsman who bowled right-arm slow-medium. He was born in Saddleworth in the former West Riding of Yorkshire.

Rhodes made his first-class debut for Lancashire against Warwickshire at Edgbaston in the 1922 County Championship. He made sixteen further first-class appearances for the county, the last of which came against Essex at the County Ground, Leyton, in the 1924 County Championship. In his seventeen first-class appearances, Rhodes scored 382 runs at an average of 17.36, with a high score of 70. One of two half centuries he made, this score came against the touring West Indians in 1923. With the ball, he took 15 wickets at a bowling average of 31.66, with best figures of 2/24.

He also played cricket for Haslingden in the Lancashire League, who played for from 1919 to 1935. He died at Blackpool, Lancashire, on 10 March 1970.

References

External links
Albert Rhodes at ESPNcricinfo
Albert Rhodes at CricketArchive

1889 births
1970 deaths
People from Saddleworth
English cricketers
Lancashire cricketers
Cricketers from Yorkshire